WQDK (99.3 FM) is a radio station broadcasting a country music format as "New Country and the Legends, 99.3 The Bull". Licensed to Gatesville, North Carolina, United States, it serves the Elizabeth City-Nags Head area.  The station is owned by Icon Broadcasting, Inc which is owned by Mark Tarte and Don Wendelken.

 

this radio station was bought out by a Christian network  on 9/21/22

External links

QDK
Radio stations established in 1968